Bartholomew and the Oobleck is a 1949 book by Dr. Seuss (Theodor Geisel). It follows the adventures of a young boy named Bartholomew Cubbins, who must rescue his kingdom from a sticky green substance called oobleck. The book is a sequel of sorts to The 500 Hats of Bartholomew Cubbins. Unlike most of Geisel's books, which are written in anapestic tetrameter, Bartholomew and the Oobleck is a prose work, like its predecessor.

Geisel said he drew inspiration for the book from a conversation he overheard while stationed in Belgium during World War II. During a rainstorm, one of his fellow soldiers remarked, "Rain, always rain. Why can't we have something different for a change?"

The book was named a Caldecott Honor Book in 1950.

Plot 
The book opens with an explanation of how people in the Kingdom of Didd still talk about "the year the King got angry with the sky", and how Bartholomew Cubbins, King Derwin's page boy, saved the kingdom. Throughout the year, Bartholomew sees the king getting angry at rain in spring, sun in summer, fog in autumn, and snow in winter because he wants something new to come down from the sky. The king gets the idea that he can rule the sky, being the king, and he orders Bartholomew to summon the Royal Magicians, who announce that they can make a substance called oobleck, which will not look anything at all like the regular weather. That evening, the magicians make the substance at their mystic mountain Neeka-tave, and release it into the air. 

The next morning, the oobleck starts falling from the sky. When the King sees it, he is overjoyed. He declares the day a holiday and orders Bartholomew to tell the Royal Bell Ringer to announce the occasion but the bell will not ring; the oobleck turns out to be both gelatinous and adhesive, and it has gummed up the bell. When Bartholomew sees a robin trapped in her nest by the oobleck, he decides to warn the kingdom.

The Royal Trumpeter tries to sound the alarm, but oobleck gets into the trumpet and the trumpeter gets his hand stuck trying to remove it.  Bartholomew tells the Captain of the Guard to warn the kingdom, but the captain, determined to prove that he's not afraid of the oobleck, scoops some up with his sword and eats it, only to get his mouth stuck and breathe out sticky green bubbles. 

In the meantime, the oobleck is falling in larger quantities than before, and is now threatening to flood the kingdom. Soon, it starts spilling into the palace as well, and pretty soon, no matter how Bartholomew tries to warn them, everybody is stuck to it and flopping about in the goo. 

In the throne room, the king, now swathed in oobleck, orders Bartholomew to summon the magicians to stop the storm, but Bartholomew delivers the bad news that "their cave on Mountain Neeka-tave is buried deep in oobleck". The king gets the idea to use the magicians' magic words ("Shuffle Duffle Muzzle Muff...") to stop the oobleck, but he cannot remember the whole incantation, and, in any case, he is not a magician.   

Bartholomew reprimands the king for making such a foolish wish, and he tells him to apologize for the mess his wish has caused. The king is reluctant at first, but belts out a tearful apology after Bartholomew tells him he's "no sort of king at all" if he and his subjects are drowning in oobleck and he won't own up to his mistakes. Immediately after the king says those simple words in tears and sobs, ("I'm Sorry"), the oobleck storm abates and the sun melts away all the green slime. The king rings the bell proclaiming the day a holiday, dedicated not to oobleck, but to rain, sun, fog, and snow—the four things that have always come down from the sky.

A version recorded by the actor Marvin Miller for RCA Records in 1959 and dramatized by Seuss himself varies slightly from the book: the king first encounters the oobleck in his royal bathtub when it comes out of the water faucet, which causes him to become stuck. Also, Bartholomew encounters Gussie, the royal cook, who is in panic with what he sees. The album from which the recording is part was nominated for the 1961 Grammy Award for Best Children's Album.

Influence
"Oobleck", a mixture of corn starch and water that exhibits non-Newtonian properties, was named after the substance in Dr. Seuss' books.

Web-series RWBY has a character called Dr. Bartholomew Oobleck, which is named after the book.

References

1949 children's books
American picture books
Books by Dr. Seuss
Caldecott Honor-winning works
Random House books
Sequel books